Guwançmuhammet Öwekow (born February 2, 1981 in Aşgabat, Turkmenistan) is a former professional Turkmen football player. He is currently a head coach of FC Ahal.

Playing career

He has played 22 games for the Turkmenistan national football team. Guwançmuhammet participated in the largest ever win for Turkmenistan, a match at home against Afghan national football team in which Öwekow scored two of Turkmenistan's eleven goals. Five years later, Ovekov made another record against the same opponent, as he scored four goals during the 5–0 win over the Afghans during a 2008 AFC Challenge Cup group stage match.

Coaching career

He has been coach of FC Ahal from 2014, led the club to the silver in 2014 Ýokary Liga.

Club career statistics
Last update: 9 March 2008

International career statistics

Goals for Senior National Team

References

External links

FIFA World Cup Qualifying article

1981 births
Living people
Turkmenistan footballers
Turkmenistan expatriate footballers
2004 AFC Asian Cup players
Expatriate footballers in Kazakhstan
FC Arsenal Kyiv players
FC Vorskla Poltava players
FC Zorya Luhansk players
Sportspeople from Ashgabat
FC Kharkiv players
Navbahor Namangan players
FC Ahal players
FC Zhetysu players
Turkmenistan expatriate sportspeople in Uzbekistan
Expatriate footballers in Uzbekistan
Turkmenistan expatriate sportspeople in Kazakhstan
Turkmenistan expatriate sportspeople in Ukraine
Expatriate footballers in Ukraine
Ukrainian Premier League players
Association football midfielders
Association football forwards
Footballers at the 2002 Asian Games
Asian Games competitors for Turkmenistan
Turkmenistan international footballers